F1RST is the fifth studio album by R&B singer O'Bryan, his first release in more than 20 years. It was released on O'Bryan's independent label, Headstorm, on Valentine's Day 2007.

Reception

The ballad-driven set derived its name from what O’Bryan calls “the first step of a new musical journey," highlighted by the songs "Just Like Doin' It," "Can I Kiss Your Lips," "Man Overboard," "Gotta Let You Go" and "Gratitude." Longtime fans of the singer welcomed his return and responded to "F1RST" with enthusiastic reviews on music buyer-driven sites such as Amazon and iTunes.

Track listing

Personnel
O'Bryan  – lead vocals, background vocals, synthesizer bass, drums, keyboards
Romy Geroso – guitar, keyboards, synth bass, drum programming

References

2007 albums
O'Bryan albums